Shizishan Subdistrict , named after Mount Shizi located in the subdistrict, is a subdistrict in southern Hongshan District, Wuhan, Hubei, China. To the east it borders the Shizitou South Lake Bridge across from Zhongnan University of Economics and Law; to the south it borders Liqiao Fishery on the southern shore of Yezhi Lake and Hongshan Subdistrict; to the west it reaches Wunan Station on the Beijing–Guangzhou railway and Zhangjiawan Subdistrict; to the north it reaches South Lake's Liantong Port on Xunsi River. Huazhong Agricultural University and the main campus of Hubei University of Technology are located in the subdistrict.

History
Shizishan Subdistrict was established in 1961.

In July 1986, Shizishan Subdistrict was transferred from Wuchang District to Hongshan District.

Geography
The western part of the subdistrict is located between two lakes (South Lake and Yezhi Lake) and around the mountain which gives the district its name. Mount Shizi is so named because it looks like a lion. Mount Shizi reaches  in height and covers 1000 mu of land with 970 mu covered in forest as of 2016. In 2015, a public greenway path was laid out around Mount Shizi. In 1957, Huazhong Agricultural University was built around Mount Shizi, the mountain from which the subdistrict takes its name.

Administrative divisions
, Shizishan Subdistrict administers thirteen residential communities:
Huanongdong, Huanongxi, Luoshilu, Shengnongkeyuan, Tonghui, Qiyi'ersuo, Hugong Hubei University of Technology), Wunantielu, Shinan, Nanhushanzhuang, Meiguiwan, Shuchenglu, Luojiayayuan

Former administrative divisions of the subdistrict include:
Sanneipei, Huakeyuan, Huakeyuan Nongchang, Wunan, Huanongyiwei, Huanong'erwei, Huanongsanwei, 7011 Gongchang, Canzhongchang, Zhoujiawan , Nanhucun, Dahualing  and Wutie

Demographics

Including both long-term residents, college students and laborers, the population is estimated to reach 180,000.

Transportation
Shizishan Subdistrict is served by several stations at the southern terminus of Line 7 (Wuhan Metro). Shizishan Subdistrict is located north of the Third Ring Road.

References

Subdistricts of the People's Republic of China
Township-level divisions of Hubei
Geography of Wuhan